Carol Johnson may refer to:

Carol Johnson (British politician) (1903–2000), British Labour politician
Carol C. Johnson (born 1941), Minnesota politician
Carol R. Johnson (1929–2020), American landscape architect and educator
Carol Johnson (academic), Australian emerita professor at the University of Adelaide
Carol Johnson, character in 88 Minutes
Carolyn 'Carol' Johnson of The Exciters

See also
Carole Johnson (disambiguation)
Carol Johnston (1958–2019), American gymnast